Egyptology: Search for the Tomb of Osiris is a fiction book created and published in the UK by Templar Publishing and published by Candlewick Press in America in 2004. The book is presented as the journal of an Egyptologist who is trying to find the tomb of Osiris. This is the second book in the Ology series.

External links

Official website of the Ology series
[https://www.unilibro.it/libro/steer-dugald/piratologia-guida-cacciatore-pirati-ediz-illustrata/9788845139529?idaff=googlebase-DI

2004 children's books
Books by Dugald Steer
Books illustrated by Helen Ward
Books illustrated by Nghiem Ta
British children's books
Candlewick Press books
Children's fiction books
Fictional diaries